Haverfordwest Beer and Cider Festival is an annual festival that takes place at Haverfordwest Castle during August.

Overview

The festival was established in 2005 and is run by volunteers. It takes place over three days, during the August bank holiday weekend (Friday, August 25 to Sunday, August 27). It attracts up to 3,000 visitors.

The emphasis is on cask ale, with over 20 Welsh breweries participating and with up to 36 types of beer. The festival also offers a variety of cider, perry, wine and mead. There are also food stalls selling local food. Other activities include crafts, children's events and live music. There is an entry fee and at previous festivals this has included a souvenir glass and a programme with detailed tasting notes.

The festival has received funding from Welsh Government.

Further reading

Business Wales, Food and Drink
About Wales, Welsh Food Festivals

See also 
Haverfordwest
Pembrokeshire 
Cuisine of Pembrokeshire.

References 

Food and drink festivals in the United Kingdom
Pembrokeshire
Annual events in Wales
2005 establishments in Wales
Festivals established in 2005
Summer events in Wales